Pantarbes is a genus of bee flies in the family Bombyliidae. There are about six described species in Pantarbes.

Species
These six species belong to the genus Pantarbes:
 Pantarbes capito Osten Sacken, 1877 i c g b
 Pantarbes earinus Hall & Evenhuis, 1984 i c g b
 Pantarbes megistus Hall & Evenhuis, 1984 i c g b
 Pantarbes pusio Osten Sacken, 1887 i c g
 Pantarbes scinax Hall and Evenhuis, 1984 i c g
 Pantarbes willistoni Osten Sacken, 1887 i c g
Data sources: i = ITIS, c = Catalogue of Life, g = GBIF, b = Bugguide.net

References

Further reading

 

Bombyliidae
Articles created by Qbugbot
Bombyliidae genera